Rajkiya Pratibha Vikas Vidyalaya (RPVV) Shalimar Bagh is one of the 21 RPVV schools established as a system of alternate schools for gifted students in Delhi. The school is known for its outstanding result and considered as one of the best government school in Delhi. The school is run by the Directorate of Education, Delhi, under the Department of Education, Government of NCT of Delhi. RPVV Shalimar Bagh is a co-educational school affiliated to Central Board of Secondary Education (CBSE), New Delhi, with classes from VI to XII standard.
The school was established in the year 2001. The founding principal of the school is Mr. S.S Singhal.

Location and campus

RPVV, Shalimar Bagh is situated in Shalimar Bagh in North Delhi, 10 km from the main campus or north campus of the University of Delhi. It has a large green area with four lawns and three playgrounds, one well equipped auditorium with a capacity of more than 800 people, a modern library with a collection of more than 10,000 books and subscription to major newspapers and magazines. The school has laboratories for sciences, social sciences, mathematics, and home science. A special maths zone is developed with help of "heymath.com", equipped with modern technology.

School Magazine
Parichay,"परिचय" the annual school magazine covers events organized by the schools, photographs of meritorious students and also features students' articles, poems, and jokes. It is published in Hindi, English and Sanskrit.

National Cadet Corps (NCC)
The school also has an active group of NCC students. There are two NCC wings in school, NCC Boys Wing and NCC Girls Wing. NCC cadets participate in different activities around the year and also attend Annual and combined annual training camps organised by the authorities.,

tGELF
RPVV, Shalimar Bagh is a member of the Global Education & Leadership Foundation (tGELF). tGELF gives training of leadership skills and ethics to the students.

Annual day
The school celebrates its annual day in the month of February, with different cultural programmes and prize distribution to meritorious students and the release of its annual magazine 'Parichaya'.

Ranking
The school is ranked sixth in India amongst the Government schools, in  a survey conducted by C-Fore for Outlook (magazine).

References

External links
  Directorate of education
  Schools in North Delhi

High schools and secondary schools in Delhi
Boys' schools in India